The 1947 season was the Hawthorn Football Club's 23rd season in the Victorian Football League and 46th overall.

Fixture

Premiership Season

Ladder

References

Hawthorn Football Club seasons